Virginia Ruzici (born 31 January 1955) is a former professional tennis player from Romania. She won the 1978 French Open singles championship.

Career
Ruzici became a professional tennis player in 1975. One of her main assets on court was her powerful forehand. In a career spanning 12 years, Ruzici won 12 career singles titles, including one Grand Slam title, the 1978 French Open. In the final, she beat 1977 French Open champion Mima Jaušovec 6–2, 6–2. Ruzici also won the French Open doubles event with Jaušovec in 1978 and reached the mixed doubles final in 1978. She appeared in the French Open singles final in 1980, but lost in straight sets to Chris Evert.

Ruzici remained in the world's top 20 from 1977 to 1983. She regularly featured in the Romania Fed Cup team throughout her career, and began playing for them in 1973, two years before turning professional.

At Wimbledon 1978, Ruzici lost a notable match in the quarterfinal to the Australian Evonne Goolagong who was playing with an injured ankle. Goolagong's injury led to her collapsing on court and her husband, Roger Cawley, came on to the court to aid his wife, technically defaulting the Australian from the match. When Goolagong recovered, Ruzici agreed to continue the match, but lost 7–5, 6–3 and was praised for her sportsmanship. It has been stated during TV commentaries that Ruzici's victory in 1980 at a tournament in Salt Lake City was watched by Richard Williams who was inspired by her triumph and prize money to teach his daughters Venus and Serena Williams to play tennis.

Ruzici is now the manager of Romanian tennis player Simona Halep.

Grand Slam tournament finals

Singles: 2 (1 title, 1 runner–up)

Women's doubles: 2 (1 title, 1 runner–up)

Mixed doubles: 2 (2 runner-ups)

WTA career finals

Singles: 27 (12–15)

Doubles: 35 (16–19)

Other finals

Singles (8–4)

Doubles (5–0)

Grand Slam singles performance

Note: The Australian Open was held twice in 1977, in January and December.

See also
 Performance timelines for all female tennis players who reached at least one Grand Slam tournament final

References

External links
 
 
 

1955 births
Living people
French Open champions
People from Câmpia Turzii
Romanian female tennis players
Grand Slam (tennis) champions in women's singles
Grand Slam (tennis) champions in women's doubles
Romanian expatriates in France
Universiade medalists in tennis
Universiade gold medalists for Romania
Universiade silver medalists for Romania
Universiade bronze medalists for Romania
Medalists at the 1977 Summer Universiade
Medalists at the 1979 Summer Universiade
Medalists at the 1981 Summer Universiade